St. Pius X Church, or St. Pius X Parish or other variations, may refer to:

St. Pius X Church, St. John's, Canada
Iglesia de San Pío X (Todoque), La Palma, Spain
St. Pius X Church (Fairfield, Connecticut), United States
Saint Pius X Catholic Church in Honolulu, Hawaii, United States

See also
St. Pius X High School (disambiguation)